Sundar Haraicha is a municipality in Morang District of Province No. 1 in Nepal. It is centered around Biratchowk town which is the gateway to Biratnagar. It borders Itahari Sub- Metropolitan city to the West, Dharan Sub- Metropolitan city to the Northwest and Belbari municipality to the East and is connected by the Mahendra Highway. It is one of the fastest growing cities in the Eastern Nepal and the second largest city of Morang district after Biratnagar with 121,305 inhabitants living in 26,677 households. It consists the town centres of Biratchowk and Gothgaun which are parts of the Greater Birat Development Area which incorporates the cities of Biratnagar-Itahari-Gothgau-Biratchowk-Dharan primarily located on the Koshi Highway in Eastern Nepal, with an estimated total urban agglomerated population of 804,300 people living in 159,332 households.

It was established on 10 March 2017 by merging the former municipalities Sundar Dulari(Sundarpur VDC and Dulari VDC) and Koshi Haraicha(Indrapur VDC, Mirgulia VDC and Haraicha VDC). At the time of the 2011 Nepal census, the localities formed had a joint population of 80,518 people living in 18,610 individual households.

History
On 10 March 2017, Sundar Haraicha was created through merging the former municipalities Sundar Dulari and Koshi Haraicha. The total population of all the predecessor villages of this municipality stands at 80,518 people living in 18,610 individual households in 2011 Nepal census.

Sundar Dulari
Sundar Dulari Municipality was a municipality in Morang District in south-eastern Nepal. The municipality was formed by the Government of Nepal merging two villages i.e. Sundarpur and Dulari in May 2014. At the time of the 1991 Nepal census it had a population of 6860 people living in 1262 individual households. Sundarpur had a population of 18,765 and Dulari had a population of 14,030 in the 2011 Nepal census making the total population of Sundar-Dulari at 32,795 inhabitants in 2011.

Koshi Haraicha
Koshi Haraicha Municipality was a municipality in Morang District in south-eastern Nepal. Earlier, the municipality was formed merging the three existing villages, Haraicha, Mrigaulia, and Indrapur, in May 2014. At the time of the 1991 Nepal census it had a population of 10,592 living in 1,930 households. The three predecessor villages, Haraicha, Mrigaulia, and Indrapur had a population of 6,484, 14,117 and 27,122 inhabitants in 2011 Nepal census making a total of 47,723 inhabitants.

Transportation  
Mahendra Highway (East-West Highway) passes 21 km through Sundar Haraicha Municipality and links the municipality to the national main road link of Nepal.

Major Town Centers
 Aadarsha Chowk
 Biratchowk
 Salakpur
 GothGaun
 Gachhiya
 Haraicha
 Indrapur
 Sundarpur
 Khorsane
Belepur
 Laxmipur
 Kumargaun
 Bansbari Sundarpur
 Tinpaini Sundarpur
 Dulari Morang

Local Election

Local Election 2074 
Not Available

Local Election 2079 

Sundarharaicha Municipality is in Morang district of Pradesh 1. There are 71,756 eligible voters for the Nepal local elections 2022, according to the Election Commission. There are 12 wards in the metropolitan city with the population of 121,305.

 Total Population : 121,305
 Number of Wards : 12
 Election Center : 25
 Number of Male Eligible Voters : 34,726
 Number of Female Eligible Voters : 37,029
 Number of Other Eligible Voters : 1
 Total Eligible Voters : 71,756

Notable people 
 Dilip Kumar Rai
Bhanu Bhakta Dhakal
Ganendra Subedi
Yama Buddha
Yukesh Chaudhary
Dr Surya B. Parajuli
Uddab Subedi

References

External links

 
Nepal municipalities established in 2014
Municipalities in Koshi Province
Municipalities in Morang District